General elections were held in Lebanon on 25 May 1947, with a second round in some constituencies on 1 June. Independent candidates won the majority of seats. Voter turnout was 61.5%.

As'ad AbuKhalil described the 1947 election as "one of the most corrupt in Lebanese history", and claimed that it was rigged by Camille Chamoun.

Results

References

External links
The black book of the Lebanese elections of May 25, 1947 ; an account tr. from the Arabic original (The crime of May 25), by Hizb al-watan. (Lebanon); ʻAḳl, George, editor, 1947

Lebanon
1947 in Lebanon
Elections in Lebanon
Election and referendum articles with incomplete results